Oedaleus australis, the Eastern Oedaleus, is a species of band-winged grasshopper in the family Acrididae. It is found in Australia.

References

External links

 

Oedipodinae
Taxa described in 1888
Taxa named by Henri Louis Frédéric de Saussure